Boualem Khoukhi (born 9 July 1990) is a professional footballer who plays as a centre-back for Al Sadd in the Qatar Stars League. Born in Algeria, he is naturalized to represent the Qatar national team.

Club career

Youth career
A pure product of the JSM Chéraga junior ranks, Khoukhi made his debut for the senior team in the 2009–10 season. He struggled in his first season, but his career was soon revived when Farid Zemiti was hired as the head coach of the club. He became integrated into the first team, playing alongside future Algeria international Islam Slimani, and many Algerian clubs were alleged to be interested in the services of Khoukhi, including USM El Harrach.

He soon received an offer from Al Shamal in Qatar, which he accepted. However, after landing in Qatar, Al Arabi head coach Uli Stielike believed Khoukhi had exceptional potential and offered him a trial at the club. He accepted the trial and was offered a contract deal shortly after.

Al Arabi (2009–2017)
Khoukhi soon earned a starting spot in Al Arabi's first team after his initial arrival in November 2009.

On 5 September 2010, he started for Al Arabi in the final of the 2010 Sheikh Jassem Cup against Lekhwiya, with Al Arabi winning 1–0.

He received a loan offer from Saudi club Al Ittihad on 10 January 2014 after his performances in the WAFF Championship. He also received a transfer offer from Japanese side Júbilo Iwata, a club coached by former Al Arabi coach Péricles Chamusca. These offers came after reports that Khoukhi was planning to leave Al Arabi. Shortly after allegations of planning to move to another club, he silenced the rumors by signing a contract renewal with Al Arabi.

Al Sadd (2017–present)
In July 2017, Khoukhi joined Al Sadd. In July 2019, Al-Gharafa announced signing him on a four-year deal but Al Sadd denied the transfer.

International career

Algeria
Khoukhi was born and raised in Algeria. On 9 November 2010, Khoukhi was called up for the first time to the Algeria under–23 national team for a pair of friendlies against Tunisia. The Qatar Football Association attempted to naturalize Khoukhi shortly after he arrived in Qatar, however, he refused and said that he would not be naturalized for any amount of money. He stated his desire was to play with the Algeria senior national team. Subsequently, he received Qatari citizenship in order to assist in his club's foreign player quota.

Qatar
Despite his call up to Algeria's Olympic team, he was called up to the Qatar B team on 13 November 2013 by compatriot Djamel Belmadi. When questioned about Khoukhi's call-up to the squad, Belmadi said that Khoukhi was naturalized prior to his call-up in order for his team, Al Arabi, to overcome the foreign player quota. Belmadi stated he was surprised when the QFA revealed Khoukhi was eligible to be called up to the Qatar national team. He made his official debut for the team on 25 December in the 2014 WAFF Championship in a 1–0 win against Palestine.

In the next match on 31 December 2013 against Saudi Arabia, who were fielding their Olympic squad, Khoukhi scored a brace and attained an assist to give his team a 4–1 win. On 4 January 2014, Khoukhi helped Qatar, once again, netting a brace against Kuwait to send Qatar to the finals.

In the final of the 2014 WAFF Championship, Khoukhi scored another brace defeating Jordan 2–0. This would bring his final goal tally to six thus becoming the tournament's top goalscorer and being lauded by the Qatar Football Association as one of the key-men to Qatar's 2015 AFC Asian Cup campaign in the future.

In their opening match of 2019 Copa America Khouki scored in Qatar's 2–2 draw with Paraguay.

International goals
Scores and results list Qatar's goal tally first.

Honours

Club
Al-Arabi
Sheikh Jassem Cup: 2008, 2010, 2011

Al-Sadd
Qatar Stars League: 2018–19, 2020–21
Qatar Cup: 2017, 2021
Emir of Qatar Cup: 2017
Sheikh Jassim Cup: 2017

International
Qatar B
WAFF Championship: 2014

Qatar
AFC Asian Cup: 2019
Gulf Cup of Nations: 2014

Individual
 AFC Asian Cup Team of the Tournament: 2019

References

External links

Qatar Stars League profile
 

1990 births
Living people
Qatari footballers
Qatar international footballers
Algerian footballers
Algerian emigrants to Qatar
Al-Arabi SC (Qatar) players
Al Sadd SC players
People from Bou Ismaïl
Naturalised citizens of Qatar
Algerian expatriate sportspeople in Qatar
JSM Chéraga players
Qatar Stars League players
2015 AFC Asian Cup players
2019 AFC Asian Cup players
Association football wingers
AFC Asian Cup-winning players
2019 Copa América players
2021 CONCACAF Gold Cup players
2022 FIFA World Cup players
FIFA Century Club